Lozove is an urban-type settlement in Khmelnytskyi Oblast, Ukraine.

Lozove may also refer to:
 Lozove, Bakhmut Raion, a village in Donetsk Oblast, Ukraine
 Lozove, Beryslav Raion, Kherson Oblast, Ukraine
 Lozove, Starobilsk Raion, a village in Luhansk Oblast, Ukraine
 Lozove, Yasynuvata Raion, a rural settlement in Donetsk Oblast, Ukraine